Crimes Act (with its variations) is a stock short title used for legislation in Australia, New Zealand and the United States, relating to the criminal law (including both substantive and procedural aspects of that law). It tends to be used for Acts which consolidate or codify the whole of the criminal law.

The Bill for an Act with this short title may have been known as a Crimes Bill during its passage through Parliament.

Crimes Acts may be a generic name either for legislation bearing that short title or for all legislation which relates to the criminal law.

List

Australia

Federal legislation
The Crimes Act 1914 (No.12)
The Crimes Act 1915 (No.6)
The Crimes Act 1926 (No.9)
The Crimes Act 1928 (No.13)
The Crimes Act 1932 (No.30)
The Crimes Act 1941 (No.6)
The Crimes Act 1955 (No.10)
The Crimes Act 1959 (No.11)
The Crimes Act 1960 (No.84)
The Crimes Act 1973 (No.33)
The Crimes Amendment Act 1982 (No.67)
The Crimes Legislation Amendment Act 1987 (No.120)
The Crimes Legislation Amendment Act 1989 (No.108)
The Crimes Legislation Amendment Act (No.2) 1989 (No.4, 1990)
The Crimes Legislation Amendment Act 1991 (No.28)
The Crimes (Investigation of Commonwealth Offences) Amendment Act 1991 (No.59)
The Crimes Legislation Amendment Act (No. 2) 1991 (No.123)
The Crimes Amendment Act 1991 (No.140)
The Crimes Legislation Amendment Act 1992 (No.164)
The Crimes (Search Warrants and Powers of Arrest) Amendment Act 1994 (No.65)
The Crimes (Child Sex Tourism) Amendment Act 1994 (No.105)
The Crimes and Other Legislation Amendment Act 1994 (No.182)
The Crimes Amendment Act 1995 (No.11) 
The Crimes Amendment (Controlled Operations) Act 1996 (No.28)
The Crimes and Other Legislation Amendment Act 1997 (No.20)
The Crimes Amendment (Enforcement of Fines) Act 1998 (No.49)
The Crimes Amendment (Forensic Procedures) Act 1998 (No.96)
The Crimes Amendment (Forensic Procedures) Act 2001 (No.22)
The Crimes Amendment (Age Determination) Act 2001 (No.37)
The Crimes Amendment Act 2002 (No.88)
The Crimes Legislation Amendment (People Smuggling, Firearms Trafficking and Other Measures) Act 2002 (No.141)
The Crimes Legislation Enhancement Act 2003 (No.41)
The Crimes Legislation Amendment (Telecommunications Offences and Other Measures) Act (No. 2) 2004 (No.127)
The Crimes Amendment Act 2005 (No.87)
The Crimes Act Amendment (Forensic Procedures) Act (No. 1) 2006 (No.130)
The Crimes Amendment (Bail and Sentencing) Act 2006 (No.171)
The Crimes Legislation Amendment (Miscellaneous Matters) Act 2008 (No.70)

State legislation
Australian Capital Territory
The Crimes Act 1900 (currently links to the NSW Act)

New South Wales
The Crimes Act 1900

Victoria
The Crimes Act 1958 (No.6231)

Hong Kong
The Crimes Ordinance 1971

New Zealand
The Crimes Act 1908
Crimes Act 1961 (No.43)

United States
Crimes Act of 1790
Crimes Act of 1825
The Major Crimes Act (1885) (codified at 18 U.S.C. § 1153)

See also
List of short titles
War Crimes Act (disambiguation)
Criminal Code

Lists of legislation by short title
Criminal law